Best selling automobiles are passenger cars and light trucks which, since the introduction of the Benz Patent Motorwagen in 1886, can claim to being the highest selling vehicles in the automobile markets.

While references to verify the manufacturers' claims have been included, there is always the possibility of inaccuracy or hyperbole. A single vehicle can be sold concurrently under several nameplates in different markets, as with for example the Nissan Sunny; in such circumstances manufacturers often provide only cumulative units sold figures for all models. As a result, there is no definitive standard for measuring units sold; 
Chrysler minivans has sold over 16 million worldwide. Volkswagen has claimed its Beetle is the best-selling car in history, as it did not substantially change throughout its production run. By contrast, Toyota has applied the Corolla nameplate to 12 generations since 1966, which have sold over 50 million through 2021.

World's bestsellers
Four cars have been widely acknowledged as the "bestselling automobile in the world" since Ford built its millionth Model T on December 10, 1915. The Model T itself remained the highest seller until forty five years after production ceased in 1927. On February 17, 1972 Volkswagen claimed that the Ford had been surpassed by the Beetle, when the 15,007,034th was manufactured. Although The Model T has subsequently been credited with 16.5 million units sold, the error is inconsequential in light of the Beetle reaching 21 million. The Model T was eventually surpassed within Ford by the Ford F-Series, a pickup truck that is directly descended from the Model T roadster pickup.

The Beetle remained the bestselling vehicle in the car industry until the late 1990s, when it was overtaken by the Toyota Corolla, due to the Corolla's good fuel mileage. However, this was an example of the modern practice of applying a brand name across a wide range of vehicles, and retaining it for marketing purposes even as the car changes drastically. While the first Corolla in 1966 was rear-wheel drive and rode on a 2286 mm wheelbase, the current hybrid and all-wheel drive models share a 2640 mm wheelbase and use a mechanically unrelated platform. Sales of the Beetle were also surpassed by its successor, the Volkswagen Golf.

The original model Lada produced by AvtoVAZ of Russia, is the most numerous vehicle ever marketed without any major design change during its production history, with over 20 million units sold between 1970 and mid-2012. The Lada, sometimes known as the "Classic" in the West, was originally based on the 1960s Fiat 124 but mechanically upgraded to cope with poor roads and harsh climates. Between 1970 and 1979, some 5 million cars had been produced. These were marketed as the VAZ-2101 (1200 sedan), VAZ-2102 (1200 estate), VAZ-2103 (quad headlights, higher-spec. interior than 1200), VAZ-2106 (improved 2103). Between 1980 and 2012 over 15 million more Ladas were produced, and these were badged for various export markets such as Rivas (UK), Signets (Canada), and Novas (Germany). The car was also built under licence in several countries (production figures unknown). Although various updates were made to the car's bumpers, steering columns, and interior fittings, as well as other minor mechanical improvements throughout its production life, the basic Fiat 124 derived design remained unchanged.

National bestsellers

Brand bestsellers

Class bestsellers

See also
 List of automobile sales by model
 Automotive industry
 List of automotive superlatives

References 

Automobiles
Bestselling
Transport-related lists of superlatives